Aideliz Hidalgo (born 1986 in Santurce) is a Puerto Rican beauty pageant titleholder who held the title of Miss Puerto Rico International 2010. She was the first black woman to compete in Miss International as Miss Puerto Rico.

Career

Nuestra Belleza Latina 2008
In the spring of 2008 Aideliz participated in the reality show/beauty contest Nuestra Belleza Latina. After weeks of auditions, Aideliz was selected as one of the final twelve finalists, in which she was eliminated on the fourth week of the show, finishing in ninth place.

Miss Universe Puerto Rico 2010
On November 12, 2009, Hidalgo competed at the Miss Universe Puerto Rico 2010 pageant where she represented the state of Cayey and placed as one of the final five finalists, in which she then resulted as the second runner-up. Hidalgo also won the award for Best Catwalk in a preliminary event that was held weeks before the final night of the pageant.

Miss International 2010
Aideliz was chosen to compete at the Miss International 2010 on November 7, 2010, in Chengdu, China. She placed in the Top 15.
Miss Puerto Rico 2010
Nuestra Belleza Latina

References

External links
Miss Puerto Rico Official Website

1986 births
Living people
People from Santurce, Puerto Rico
Miss Puerto Rico winners
Miss International 2010 delegates
Puerto Rican people of Dominican Republic descent